Prasophyllum readii, commonly known as the Streathem leek orchid, is a species of orchid endemic to Victoria. It has a single, tubular leaf and up to twenty five scented, greenish-brown to reddish-brown flowers with a white or pinkish labellum and is only known from a swamp in the south-west of the state.

Description
As with others in the genus, the flowers are inverted so that the labellum is above the column rather than below it. There is a raised, greenish, channelled callus in the centre of the labellum and extending almost to its tip. Flowering occurs in December and January.

Taxonomy and naming
Prasophyllum readii was first formally described in 2006 by David Jones and Dean Rouse from a specimen collected near Streatham and the description was published in Australian Orchid Research. The specific epithet (readii) honours Myles Read, the honour of the property where the type specimen was found.

Distribution and habitat
The Streathem leek orchid grows in a swamp with sedges and rushes and is only known from the type location.

Conservation
This orchid species is only known from about 1,000 plants at the type location and is listed as "Endangered" in the Victorian Government Flora and Fauna Guarantee Act 1988.

References

External links 
 

readii
Flora of Victoria
Endemic orchids of Australia
Plants described in 2006